Tobias Stone (June 6, 1919 – February 15, 2012) was an American bridge player and writer from New York City.

Stone was born in Manhattan. He and Janice Gilbert married in 1955; divorced in 1975. He retired from bridge and in 1986 moved to Las Vegas, where he died in 2012.

Stone was inducted into the ACBL Hall of Fame in 2003.

Publications 
 237 pages.
 237 pages. Preface revised by Alvin Roth.

Bridge accomplishments

Honors

 ACBL Hall of Fame, 2003

Awards

 Fishbein Trophy (1) 1956

Wins

 North American Bridge Championships (16)
 Master Individual (1) 1953 
 von Zedtwitz Life Master Pairs (1) 1956 
 Wernher Open Pairs (1) 1947 
 Open Pairs (1928-1962) (1) 1942 
 Vanderbilt (3) 1943, 1959, 1960 
 Marcus Cup (1) 1960 
 Mitchell Board-a-Match Teams (2) 1961, 1963 
 Chicago Mixed Board-a-Match (1) 1965 
 Reisinger (2) 1952, 1961 
 Spingold (3) 1953, 1956, 1957

Runners-up

 Bermuda Bowl (1) 1958
 North American Bridge Championships
 von Zedtwitz Life Master Pairs (2) 1942, 1965 
 Silodor Open Pairs (2) 1958, 1965 
 Wernher Open Pairs (1) 1952 
 Hilliard Mixed Pairs (1) 1956 
 Open Pairs (1928-1962) (1) 1958 
 Vanderbilt (2) 1966, 1969 
 Mitchell Board-a-Match Teams (2) 1952, 1959 
 Chicago Mixed Board-a-Match (2) 1942, 1956 
 Spingold (2) 1961, 1963

References

External links
 
 
 

1919 births
2012 deaths
American contract bridge players
Bermuda Bowl players
Contract bridge writers
Writers from New York City